The 1997 Allan Cup was the Canadian senior ice hockey championship for the 1996–97 senior "AAA" season.  The event was hosted by the Powell River Regals in Powell River, British Columbia.  The 1997 tournament marked the 89th time that the Allan Cup has been awarded.

Teams
Powell River Regals (Host)
Stony Plain Eagles (Pacific)
Truro Bearcats (East)
Warroad Lakers (West)

Results
Round Robin
Warroad Lakers 6 - Stony Plain Eagles 5
Powell River Regals 5 - Truro Bearcats 2
Truro Bearcats 8 - Stony Plain Eagles 3
Powell River Regals 4 - Warroad Lakers 1
Truro Bearcats 4 - Warroad Lakers 3
Stony Plain Eagles 3 - Powell River Regals 3
Semi-final
Warroad Lakers 3 - Truro Bearcats 0
Final
Powell River Regals 7 - Warroad Lakers 3

External links
Allan Cup archives 
Allan Cup website

Allan Cup
Allan